Fredy Setiawan (born 29 November 1991) is an Indonesian para badminton player. He won the bronze medal in the men singles SL4 event of the 2020 Summer Paralympics.

Awards and nominations

Achievements

Paralympic Games 
Men's singles

World Championships
Men's singles

Mixed doubles

Asian Para Games 
Men's singles

Men's doubles

Mixed doubles

ASEAN Para Games 
Men's singles

Men's doubles

Mixed doubles

BWF Para Badminton World Circuit (5 titles, 3 runners-up) 

The BWF Para Badminton World Circuit – Grade 2, Level 1, 2 and 3 tournaments has been sanctioned by the  Badminton World Federation from 2022.

Men's singles 

Men's doubles

Mixed doubles

International Tournaments (17 titles, 8 runners-up) 

Men's singles 

Men's doubles

Mixed doubles

References

Notes

External links
 Fredy Setiawan at BWFpara.tournamentsoftware.com

1991 births
Living people
People from Surakarta
Indonesian para-badminton players
Paralympic badminton players of Indonesia
Paralympic bronze medalists for Indonesia
Paralympic medalists in badminton
Medalists at the 2020 Summer Paralympics
Badminton players at the 2020 Summer Paralympics
Indonesian male badminton players
21st-century Indonesian people
20th-century Indonesian people